Choi Jin-Soo (born 17 June 1990) is a South Korean footballer who plays as midfielder for Ulsan Citizen FC in K3 League.

Career
Choi Jin-Soo was selected by Ulsan Hyundai in 2010 K-League Draft. Choi made his K-League debut against Pohang Steelers, coming on as a substitute in the 1–1 draw on 5 May 2010.

References

External links 

1990 births
Living people
Association football midfielders
South Korean footballers
Ulsan Hyundai FC players
FC Anyang players
Ansan Mugunghwa FC players
K League 1 players
K League 2 players